Pierces Creek may refer to:

 Pierces Creek, Queensland, a town in Queensland, Australia
 Pierces Creek, Australian Capital Territory, a former forestry settlement on the outskirts of Canberra